Kızıltepe District is a district of Mardin Province in Turkey which has the town of Kızıltepe as its seat. The district had a population of 263,938 in 2021 making it the most populous district of the province.

Creation 
According to the 2012 Metropolitan Municipalities Law (Law No. 6360), all Turkish provinces with a population more than 750,000 will become metropolitan municipalities and the districts within the metropolitan municipalities  will be second-level municipalities. The law also created new districts within the provinces in addition to current districts.

Settlements 
The district encompasses 183 neighborhoods of which eighteen form the city of Kızıltepe.

Center neighborhoods 

 Atatürk
 Bahçelievler
 Cumhuriyet
 Dunaysır
 Ersoylu
 Fırat
 İpek
 Koçhisar
 Mevlana
 Mezopotamya
 Sanayi
 Selahattin Eyyubi
 Şahkulubey
 Tepebaşı
 Turgut Özal
 Yeni Mahalle
 Yenikent
 Zergan

Rural neighborhoods 

 Akalın
 Akça
 Akçapınar
 Akdoğan
 Akkoç
 Aktepe 
 Aktulga
 Akyazı
 Akyüz
 Akziyaret
 Alakuş
 Alemdar
 Alipaşa
 Altıntoprak
 Arakapı
 Araköy
 Arıklı
 Arıtepe
 Aslanlı
 Aşağıazıklı
 Ataköy
 Atmaca
 Ayaz
 Bağrıbütün
 Barış
 Başak
 Başdeğirmen
 Bektaş
 Belli
 Beşevler
 Beşik
 Bözhüyük
 Büyükayrık
 Büyükboğaziye
 Büyükdere
 Büyüktepe
 Cantaşı 
 Çağıl
 Çakır
 Çamlıca
 Çamlıdere
 Çanaklı
 Çatalca
 Çaybaşı
 Çetinkaya
 Çetinler
 Çınarcık
 Çıplak
 Çimenli
 Çitlibağ
 Damlalı
 Demet
 Demirci
 Demirkapı
 Demirler
 Dikmen
 Doğanlı
 Doyuran
 Dörtyol
 Dura
 Düğürk
 Ekinlik
 Elbeyli
 Elmalı
 Erdem
 Erikli
 Eroğlu
 Esenli
 Eskin
 Eşme
 Eymirli
 Fındıktepe
 Göllü
 Gözlüce
 Güçlü
 Gümüşdere
 Güneştepe
 Güngören
 Günlüce
 Gürmeşe
 Hacıhasan
 Hacıyusuf
 Hakverdi
 Halkalı
 Harmandüzü
 Haznedar
 Hocaköy
 Ilıcak
 Işıklar
 Işıkören
 İkikuyu
 İkizler
 İnandı
 Kahraman
 Kalaycık
 Karabent
 Karakulak
 Karakuyu
 Karaman 
 Kaşıklı
 Katarlı
 Kayapınar
 Kaynarca
 Kengerli
 Kılduman
 Kırkkuyu
 Kilimli
 Kocalar
 Koçlu
 Konuklu
 Köprübaşı
 Körsu
 Küçükayrık
 Küçükboğaziye
 Küplüce
 Odaköy
 Ofis
 Ortaköy
 Otluk
 Örencik
 Rıhani
 Sancarlı
 Sandıklı
 Sarıca
 Saruhan
 Sevimli
 Soğanlı
 Sürekli
 Şenyurt
 Tanrıverdi
 Tarlabaşı
 Taşlıca
 Tatlıca
 Tiraşlı
 Timurçiftliği
 Tosunlu
 Tuzlaköy
 Tuzluca
 Ulaşlı
 Uluköy
 Uzunkaya
 Üçevler
 Ülkerköy
 Yalınkılıç
 Yamaç 
 Yamanlar
 Yarımca
 Yaşarköy
 Yayıklı
 Yaylım
 Yedikardeş
 Yeşilköy
 Yeşiller
 Yolaldı
 Yoldere
 Yolüstü
 Yoncalı
 Yukarıazıklı
 Yumrucuk
 Yumrutaş
 Yurtderi
 Yurtözü
 Yüceli
 Yüksektepe
 Ziyaret

References 

Districts of Mardin Province